Anechuromyia is a genus of bristle flies in the family Tachinidae.

Species
Anechuromyia nigrescens Mesnil & Shima, 1979

Distribution
Japan, Russia.

References

Exoristinae
Diptera of Asia
Tachinidae genera
Monotypic Brachycera genera